Moses Kekūāiwa (July 20, 1829 – November 24, 1848) was a member of the royal family of the Kingdom of Hawaii.

Early life and family 
Kekūāiwa was born on July 20, 1829, in Honolulu, as noted by American merchant Stephen Reynolds, who called the child "a fine boy". He was named Kekūāiwa after his maternal aunt Queen Kamāmalu, the favorite wife of Kamehameha II, who was also known as Kamehamalu Kekūāiwaokalani.

He was the second son of Mataio Kekūanāoʻa and Elizabeth Kīnaʻu, and a grandson of Kamehameha I through his mother, who was known as Kaʻahumanu II when she was serving as regent and Kuhina Nui. His maternal grandmother Kalākua Kaheiheimālie was one of the wives of Kamehameha I whom he had wed under the rites of hoao-wohi. Kaheiheimālie was also the younger sister to Queen Kaʻahumanu, the king's favorite wife, who co-ruled as Kuhina Nui with his successors Kamehameha II and Kamehameha III starting in 1819.

He had three brothers, David Kamehameha (1828–1835), Lot Kapuāiwa (1830–1872), Alexander Liholiho (1834–1863), and a sister, Princess Victoria Kamāmalu (1838–1866). Their Hawaiian contemporaries considered these five siblings to be of divine rank. He had other siblings, an unnamed, elder half-brother, from his mother's previous marriage to Kahalaiʻa Luanuʻu, who died young, and half-sister, Ruth Keʻelikōlani (1826–1883), from his father's previous marriage to Pauahi.

Shortly after his birth, the child was adopted according to Hawaiian custom (hānai) by High Chief Kaikioʻewa, the then incumbent Governor of Kauai and former guardian of King Kamehameha III. It was expected from an early age that he would succeed his adoptive father and become the Governor of Kauai.

Education 
He was ten years old when his uncle, King Kamehameha III, placed him in the Chiefs' Children's School, the exclusive school for the children eligible to be rulers. Along with his other classmates, he was chosen by Kamehameha III to be eligible for the throne of the Kingdom of Hawaii.  The boarding school was taught by the American missionary couple Amos Starr Cooke and Juliette Montague Cooke while John Papa ʻĪʻī and his wife Sarai Hiwauli, who were originally only the kahu (caretaker) of Princess Victoria Kamāmalu, were appointed by the King as kahu to the royal children.

His hānai (High Chief Kaikioʻewa) died on April 10, 1839, and Moses went to Kauai to assume the governorship of the island. In his lifetime, he was referred to as the "prospective Governor of Kauai"; the nominal governess during the time, Keaweamahi, and later his cousin, Kekauʻōnohi, were merely placeholders for the position until Moses came of age.

On one occasion when Mr. Cooke was disciplining the students, he struck Alexander on the head and Moses replied, "he keiki a ke ali'i oia nei," which translates to, "He is the son of the chief." Cooke replied "I am the King of this school." A troublesome student, he was expelled on February 1, 1847, after he was caught visiting Queen Kalama at night. On that day, King Kamehameha III and the Privy Council made Moses sign a document expelling him from the school and relinquishing control of his property until he reached majority. ʻĪʻī was appointed his kahu and William Richards was appointed his guardian.

According to Albert Pierce Taylor, Kekūāiwa assembled a company of young Hawaiian men and drilled them in military combat in the Koʻolau district of Oahu. The explanation was that he planned to lead a voyage of conquest to Tahiti and the Society Islands, but it was also suspected that he planned on seizing the Hawaiian throne by force.

Betrothal to Tahitian princess 
Kekūāiwa, as the eldest male of his generation and a lineal descendant of Kamehameha I, was expected to marry a high chiefess of rank to continue the royal line. He was originally betrothed to his classmate Jane Loeau, the eldest female student at the Royal School and the daughter of Governess Kuini Liliha. The Cookes encouraged her to marry American lawyer John Jasper instead of Moses.
By 1848, Kekūāiwa was engaged to the Tahitian Princess Ninito Teraʻiapo (d. 1898) in one of a series of historical attempts of marriage alliances between the royals of Hawaii and Tahiti. Teraʻiapo was a niece of Tute Tehuiari'i, the private chaplain of Kamehameha III, and cousin of Manaiula Tehuiarii.  She was also a female relative of the Tahitian Queen Pōmare IV, and the sister of High Chiefess Ariitaimai, the mother of Queen Marau, wife of Pōmare V, the last King of Tahiti. She set sail for Hawaii, but arrived in Honolulu to the news of his death.

Death and legacy 
Kekūāiwa died November 24, 1848, in Honolulu during a measles epidemic. He was 19 years old, unmarried, and without any children. His funeral service was held on December 30, 1848, alongside two other services: one for Kaʻiminaʻauao, the hānai daughter of Queen Kalama and younger sister of his classmates Kalākaua and Liliuokalani, and the other for William Pitt Leleiohoku, the late husband of his half-sister and father of his classmate John William Pitt Kīnaʻu.
Originally buried in the Old Mausoleum on the grounds where the current ʻIolani Palace stands, his remains were transported along with those of his father and other royals in a midnight torch-lit procession on October 30, 1865, to the newly constructed Mauna ʻAla Royal Mausoleum in the Nuʻuanu Valley.

On March 17, 1912, the Cooke Memorial Tablet was dedicated at Kawaiahaʻo Church commemorating the sixteen royal children of the original Royal School, and their teachers, on the one hundredth anniversary of the birth of Juliette Montague Cooke. The ceremony was officiated by Liliʻuokalani and Elizabeth Kekaʻaniau, the last surviving members of the Royal School. Kekūāiwa's name was placed first among the sixteen students.

See also 
Hawaii – Tahiti relations

References

Bibliography

Further reading 

1829 births
1848 deaths
Royalty of the Hawaiian Kingdom
Princes of Hawaii
House of Kamehameha
Infectious disease deaths in Hawaii
Burials at the Royal Mausoleum (Mauna ʻAla)
Hawaiian adoptees (hānai)
Deaths from measles